Kandavarundo is a 1972 Indian Malayalam film, directed by Mallikarjuna Rao and produced by C. J. Ranganathan. The film stars Sadhana, Vincent, Renuka and Adoor Bhasi in the lead roles. The film had musical score by R. K. Shekhar.

Cast

Sadhana
Vincent
Renuka
Adoor Bhasi
Muthukulam Raghavan Pillai
Sankaradi
Sreelatha Namboothiri
T. S. Muthaiah
Paul Vengola
A. V. M. Rajan
Abbas
Bahadoor
Florida
Jayakumari
Kedamangalam Ali
Khadeeja
 Baby Vijaya
Mathew Plathottam
Menon
Punaloor Rajan
Venu
 Koya Chavakkadu
 Haridas
 Radhakrishnan

Soundtrack
The music was composed by R. K. Shekhar and the lyrics were written by Sreekumaran Thampi.

References

External links
 

1972 films
1970s Malayalam-language films